The Men competition at the 2020 World Sprint Speed Skating Championships was held on 28 and 29 February 2020.

Results

500 m
The race started on 28 February at 18:07.

1000 m
The race started on 28 February at 19:46.

500 m
The race started on 29 February at 11:07.

1000 m
The race was started at 13:59.

Overall standings
After all races.

References

Men